McNary is a surname. Notable people with the surname include:

Charles L. McNary (1874–1944), U.S. Republican politician
John Hugh McNary (1867–1936), U.S. federal district court judge
Joshua Aaron McNary (born 1988), American football player
William S. McNary (1863–1930), U.S. Representative